Valter Sentimenti (19 March 1923 – 1 April 1987) was an Italian boxer. He competed in the men's middleweight event at the 1952 Summer Olympics.

References

External links
 

1923 births
1987 deaths
Italian male boxers
Olympic boxers of Italy
Boxers at the 1952 Summer Olympics
Place of birth missing
Mediterranean Games bronze medalists for Italy
Mediterranean Games medalists in boxing
Boxers at the 1951 Mediterranean Games
Middleweight boxers
20th-century Italian people